Ginestra may refer to:

 Ginestra, an Arbëreshë town and comune in the Province of Potenza, Basilicata, Italy
 Ginestra degli Schiavoni, municipality in the Province of Benevento in the Italian region Campania, Italy
 Ginestra Bianconi, network scientist and mathematical physicist
 Ginestra (surname), Italian surname
 8716 Ginestra, a minor planet

See also
Genista, a genus of flowering plants in the legume family Fabaceae